Kintampo North Municipal District is one of the eleven districts in Bono East Region, Ghana. Originally it was formerly part of the then-larger Kintampo District on 10 March 1989, until the southern part of the district was split off to create Kintampo South District on 12 November 2003 (effectively 17 February 2004); thus the remaining part has been renamed as Kintampo North District, which it was later elevated to municipal district assembly status on 1 November 2007 (effecitvely 29 February 2008) to become Kintampo North Municipal District. The municipality is located in the northern part of Bono East Region and has Kintampo as its capital town.

List of settlements

Sources
 
 District: Kintampo North Municipal District
 19 New Districts Created, November 20, 2003.

References

Districts of Bono East Region